Satchwell is a surname. Notable people with the surname include:

Benjamin Satchwell (1732–1810), British philanthropist
Brooke Satchwell (born 1980), Australian actress, model, and environmental spokeswoman
Kathleen Satchwell, South African judge
Kevin Satchwell (born 1951), British educator